Yendi is a town and the capital of Yendi Municipal district in the  Northern Region of Ghana. As of 2012 the population of Yendi was 52,008 people. It is the seat of the King of the Dagbon, Ghana's oldest kingdom.

Climate

Economy
The people of Yendi are mainly peasant farmers who grow grains especially corn, guinea corn and millet. They also grow tubers such as yam. Yendi is a commercial hub as it is caught in the middle of most towns/villages in the northern corridor. Most people travelling to Tamale and beyond from the Eastern corridor have to go through Yendi thus making it an important transport hub.

Culture 
Yendi is an important cultural centre as it is home to the Dagbon king's seat. The Yaa Naa lives in Yendi where he has his palace.

Mining 

In 2004, proposals surfaced to link iron ore mines in the vicinity of Yendi by rail.

see Sheini Hills

See also
 Yendi Airport
 Yendi Senior High School
Gbewaa palace

References

Populated places in the Northern Region (Ghana)
Dagbon